Jim Spencer (November 3, 1901 – March 6, 1961) was an American football player. He played college football at Dayton and professional football in the National Football League (NFL) as a guard for the Dayton Triangles. He appeared in 11 NFL games, nine as a starter, during the 1928 and 1929 seasons.

References

1901 births
1961 deaths
Dayton Flyers football players
Dayton Triangles players
Players of American football from Hawaii